Daigle House, also known as Revillon House or as La Maison Revillon, is a historic Creole cottage located at 1012 South Washington Street in Lafayette, Louisiana.

Built in Greek Revival style c.1880 by Jules Revillon, it is a five bay structure with a center entrance.  It has a full front gallery featuring Doric posts with ogee molded capitals and a nearly full entablature. The front has two large dormers with pediments, pilasters and modest entablatures.

The house was purchased by Sidney and Norma Daigle in 1924.  It was purchased by George and Pat Bradley in 2004, and, in 2017, is used as a real estate firm's office.

The house was listed on the National Register of Historic Places on June 14, 1984.

See also
 National Register of Historic Places listings in Lafayette Parish, Louisiana

Notes

References

Houses on the National Register of Historic Places in Louisiana
Greek Revival architecture in Louisiana
Houses completed in 1880
Lafayette Parish, Louisiana
National Register of Historic Places in Lafayette Parish, Louisiana